Education in the Cook Islands has close ties with the educational system of New Zealand. Primary and secondary education are free and attendance is compulsory for children between the ages of five and fifteen. Some degree courses are provided by the University of the South Pacific.

History
Education in a Western sense began with missionaries in the early part of the 19th century. The first schools began with British missionaries from the London Missionary Society and later the Seventh-day Adventists and possibly other church groups. 

Tereora College was one such school. It was an LMS school and closed early in the 1900s. Fifty years later it  reopened, in 1954, as a public school.

The European School, began in the 1920s. In the 1930s, it was based in the Sunday School Hall, on the seaward side of the Avarua Cook Islands Christian Church at the main town in Rarotonga. It is not known at this stage as to whether it was a London Missionary Society school or privately run. However the school closed in the 1940s.

In the late 1940s, the New Zealand administration opened the Avarua Side School, which was an adjunct school of the Avarua Maori School. In 1958, the Side School moved to Nikao and eventually in 1975, the Nikao Side School was renamed the Avatea School.

In 1975, Nukutere College, a Catholic secondary school in Avarua, commenced operations. The school has been staffed by religious and lay staff. The Christian Brothers provided staff for the college from 1976 to 2009.

Primary and secondary education
The Cook Islands Ministry of Education operates 22 government schools. In addition, there are 8 private educational institutions.

Tertiary education
The University of the South Pacific operates a campus on Rarotonga. Some tertiary courses are available through the Cook Islands Tertiary Training Institute.

See also
Mana Strickland
 List of schools in the Cook Islands

References